Dhanush Chandra Gautam (1932–2006), professionally known as Dha. Cha. Gotame was a Nepalese writer. He published multiple books and edited multiple newspaper and magazines in his lifetime. He won the prestigious Madan Puraskar for his novel Ghamka Pailaharu.

Early life and education 
He was born on December 26, 1932 (Poush 12, 1989 BS) in Manarakatti village of Mahottari district to father Govinda Chandra Gautam and mother Deepwati Devi Gautam. He was expelled from his school for being involved in anti-Rana politics. He completed his matriculation from India. He got his IA degree from GBB College, Muzaffarpur. After graduation, he became a high level member of Communist Party of Nepal, established by Pushpa Lal Shrestha.

Literary career 
He started his literary career by publishing a story called Parda in Sewa, a monthly literary magazine from Birgunj in 2008 BS. Although he had penned some poems and titled the manuscript as Niharika, he never published it. He started a literary magazine called Bachhita in 2015 BS. He additionally worked as an editor for Filingo (weekly) and Jhankar magazines.

Notable works 
 Ghamka Pailaharu
 Yaha Dekhi Tyaha Samma
 Kalanatar
 Sagya Sarbanam
 Samjhana ka Galchhedaharu
 Teen Baas
 Utarotar
 Aroha Abaroha

Awards 
He won the prestigious Madan Puraskar and Sajha Puraskar for his novel, Ghamka Pailaharu. He again won the Sajha Puraskar for Yaha Dekhi Tyaha Samma. He was awarded with Sarbashrestha Pandulipi Prize in 2061 BS.

Personal life 
He was married to Shanta Devi Gautam. His brother Dhurba Chandra Gautam is also a renowned writer. He died in 2063 BS (2006 AD).

See also 
 Dhruba Chandra Gautam
 Madan Mani Dixit
 Madhav Prasad Ghimire

References 

20th-century Nepalese writers
Nepalese male writers
Madan Puraskar winners
Nepalese writers
Sajha Puraskar winners
People from Mahottari District
1932 births
2006 deaths